Shahrulnizam Mazlan (born 5 September 2000) is a Singaporean footballer currently playing as a forward for Young Lions FC.  He scored his debut goal against Tanjong Pagar United.

Career statistics

Club

Notes

References

Living people
2000 births
Singaporean footballers
Association football goalkeepers
Singapore Premier League players